Webster Township is one of fifteen townships in Wayne County, Indiana, United States. As of the 2010 census, its population was 1,272 and it contained 552 housing units.

History
Webster Township was organized in 1870.

Geography
The streams of Dover Run, High Brook, Long Creek, Nail Creek, Quill Creek, Single Creek, Spike Brook, Tie Run, Web Branch, Web Creek and Webster Creek run through this township.

Unincorporated towns
 Wayne at 
 Webster at 
(This list is based on USGS data and may include former settlements.)

Adjacent townships
 New Garden Township (northeast)
 Wayne Township (southeast)
 Center Township (southwest)
 Green Township (northwest)

Cemeteries
The township contains one cemetery, Dover.

Major highways
 U.S. Route 35
 Indiana State Road 38

References
 U.S. Board on Geographic Names (GNIS)
 United States Census Bureau cartographic boundary files

External links
 Indiana Township Association
 United Township Association of Indiana

Townships in Wayne County, Indiana
Townships in Indiana